The Blues Is Where It's At is an album by blues pianist/vocalist Otis Spann recorded in 1966 and originally released by the BluesWay label.

Track listing
All compositions by Otis Spann except where noted
 "Popcorn Man" (McKinley Morganfield) − 2:20
 "Brand New House" (Bobby Darin, Woody Harris) − 3:04
 "Chicago Blues" (Otis Spann, George Spink) − 3:19
 "Steel Mill Blues" − 4:17
 "Down On Sarah Street" − 3:05
 "T'Aint Nobody's Bizness If I Do" (Porter Grainger, Clarence Williams, Robert Prince) − 3:52
 "Nobody Knows Chicago Like I Do (Party Blues)" − 2:35
 "My Home Is On the Delta" (Morganfield) − 3:12
 "Spann Blues" − 4:28

Personnel
Otis Spann − piano, vocals
George Smith − harmonica
Luther Johnson, Muddy Waters, Sammy Lawhorn − guitar
Mac Arnold − electric bass
Francis Clay – drums
Technical
Bob Arnold - engineer
Joe Lebow - design
Charles Shabacon - photography

References

1966 albums
Otis Spann albums
Albums produced by Bob Thiele
BluesWay Records albums